is a Japanese car racer and TV reporter.  He has raced in several 24-hour races, including Daytona and LeMans.  He also raced 4 times in the Indianapolis 500, in 1994-1996 and 1999, usually for Beck Motorsports. He also drove in one CART Championship Car race at Twin Ring Motegi in his native Japan. He is the brother-in-law of Beat Takeshi.

Racing record

Indy Car World Series / CART

Indy Racing League

Indy 500 results

Complete JGTC/Super GT results

24 Hours of Le Mans results

External links
Race Driver Database: Hideshi Matsuda
Racing Reference: Hideshi Matsuda

1954 births
Japanese racing drivers
Living people
Indianapolis 500 drivers
IndyCar Series drivers
Super GT drivers
Japanese Formula Two Championship drivers
Japanese Formula 3000 Championship drivers
Japanese Touring Car Championship drivers
24 Hours of Le Mans drivers
World Sportscar Championship drivers
24 Hours of Spa drivers
Asian Le Mans Series drivers
Japanese IndyCar Series drivers
Sportspeople from Kōchi Prefecture
People from Kōchi, Kōchi
Oreca drivers
Nürburgring 24 Hours drivers